Melaleuca incana subsp. tenella is a plant in the myrtle family Myrtaceae which is endemic to the south coast of Western Australia. It was formerly known as Melaleuca tenella Benth. but was reduced to a subspecies in 1998. It is similar to M. incana subsp. incana except in the form of the plant, the size and shape of its leaves, its flowering time and distribution.

Description 
The leaves and young branches are covered with fine, soft hairs giving the foliage a grey appearance.

The flowers are arranged in spikes, usually on the ends of branches which continue to grow after flowering. The stamens are arranged in five bundles around the flower, each bundle containing between 3 and 11 stamens.

Taxonomy and naming
The species Melaleuca tenella had been originally described in 1867 in Flora Australiensis from a specimen collected by George Maxwell "in moist soil, tributaries of the Phillips River".
In a review of the genus in 1998, Melaleuca tenella Benth. was reduced to the present subspecies. The subspecies name (tenella) is from the Latin tener meaning "soft", "delicate" or "tender", "in reference to the appearance of the type specimen of this plant".

Distribution and habitat
Melaleuca incana subsp. tenella occurs near the coast of Western Australia between the Esperance district and Cape Arid in the Esperance Plains and Mallee biogeographic regions. It grows in sand in swampy sites.

References

incana subsp. tenella
Myrtales of Australia
Rosids of Western Australia
Plants described in 1819
Plant subspecies